Robert Wasserman is the name of:
Lew Wasserman (Lewis Robert Wasserman, 1913–2002), American talent agent and manager
Bob Wasserman (1934–2011), American politician and former police chief
Rob Wasserman (1952–2016), American musician
Robert Harold Wasserman in list of members of the National Academy of Sciences (Animal, nutritional and applied microbial sciences) since 1980 and in list of Guggenheim Fellowships awarded in 1964